Grötzingen is a town and eastern suburb of Karlsruhe, Germany. On 31 December 2020 it had a population of 9,156. It contains Augustenburg Castle, a church. Pfinztal lies just to the southeast.

See also
Grötzingen Jewish Cemetery

References

External links
Private site

Karlsruhe
Boroughs of Karlsruhe